Ramez Naam is an American technologist and science fiction writer. He is best known as the author of the Nexus Trilogy. His other books include The Infinite Resource: The Power of Ideas on a Finite Planet and More than Human: Embracing the Promises of Biological Enhancement. He is currently co-chair for energy and the environment at Singularity University.

Earlier in his life, Naam was a computer scientist at Microsoft for 13 years and led teams working on Outlook, Internet Explorer, and Bing.

Early life 
Naam was born in Cairo, Egypt to a Coptic Christian family, and came to the United States when he was three years old. He has worked as a lifeguard. Naam worked at Microsoft for 13 years, and led teams working on Outlook, Internet Explorer, and Bing.

Career 
Ramez Naam is an adjunct professor at Singularity University, where he lectures on energy, environment, and innovation. He has appeared on Sunday morning MSNBC, Yahoo! Finance, China Cable Television, BigThink, and Reuters.FM. His work has appeared in, or has been reviewed by, The New York Times, The Wall Street Journal, The Los Angeles Times, The Atlantic, Slate, Business Week, Business Insider, Discover, Popular Science, Wired, and Scientific American.

Naam's book Nexus was one of NPR’s best books of 2013. Nexus and its sequels explore the risks and potential rewards of a technology allowing humans to link their mind directly to one another.

Awards 

In 2005 he received the H.G. Wells Award for Contributions to Transhumanism.

In 2014 Nexus won the Prometheus Award, and he was nominated for the John W. Campbell Award for Best New Writer. In 2015 Apex won the Philip K. Dick Award.

Books

Non-fiction 
 More than Human: Embracing the Promise of Biological Enhancement. Broadway Books, 2005
 The Infinite Resource: The Power of Ideas on a Finite Planet. University Press of New England, 2013

Fiction

The Nexus Trilogy
 Nexus (December 2012)
 Crux (August 2013)
 Apex (May 2015)

References

External links
 
 Interview with O’Reilly Radar Podcast
 Interview with BookBrowse
 Naam's law

American computer businesspeople
American nanotechnologists
American computer specialists
Living people
Egyptian emigrants to the United States
Writers from Seattle
American transhumanists
Year of birth missing (living people)
American male novelists
Coptic Christians from Egypt